Litfiba was an Italian rock band formed in Florence, Italy, in early 1980.

The band evolved from British-influenced new wave rock to a more personal rock sound influenced by Mediterranean vibes; their songs are mostly sung in Italian.

History

First era (1980-1989)
The band was formed in Florence in 1980, and was named after the telex code for Via dei Bardi, Florence, where the band rehearsed (Località ITalia FIrenze Via dei BArdi).
The early line-up consisted of: Federico Renzulli (nicknamed Ghigo) on guitars and lead vocals, Gianni Maroccolo on bass, Sandro Dotta on lead guitar (who left the band after a few weeks) and Francesco Calamai on drums.
Antonio Aiazzi on keyboards and Piero Pelù on vocals joined the band shortly after. Punk and new wave were a huge influence on the band's early songs, which often had English lyrics.

Their first show took place on 6 December 1980 in Settignano, near Florence.

The band's first recording was a five-track EP titled Guerra (1982), followed one year later by a 7" single, "Luna/La preda", which won the band first place at the 2° Festival Rock Italiano.

Meanwhile, Calamai was replaced on drums by Renzo Franchi; with this line-up, the band worked on a soundtrack album, Eneide di Krypton.

After a while, Franchi then left the band, to be replaced by Luca De Benedectis, known as Ringo De Palma with whom the band recorded Yassassin, a  single containing a brand new track, "Electrica Danza", and a David Bowie cover.

Trilogy of power 
The band released their first full-length album, Desaparecido ("Disappeared" in Spanish) in 1985.
Following the EP, Transea (1986) and the second full-length 17 Re (17 Kings in Italian), Litfiba toured for the first time, subsequently releasing 12/5/87 (aprite i vostri occhi), their first live album.
Litfiba 3 (1988) was the last recording featuring Maroccolo, de Palma et Aiazzi as permanent members, although the latter would stay as session musician until 1996.

The first three albums form the "Trilogy of power" (in Italian, "Trilogia del potere"), stating the refusal of every kind of totalitarianism.
The release of the Pirata live album, recorded on the 1988-89 tour, marked the end of the "Trilogy of power" years.

Second era (1989-1999)
The second leg of the tour was made into an aptly titled VHS, "Pirata Tour", and featured Roberto Terzani on bass, Daniele Trambusti on drums and Candelo Cabezas on percussions besides Pelù, Renzulli and Aiazzi.
Pelù and Renzulli then went back to the studio to record El Diablo, an album with a much rawer sound, warmly received by fans and critics alike.
The following tour, with Federico Poggipollini on rhythm guitar, was also filmed for home video release.

Sales of the (1992) released Sogno Ribelle album proved the band's new fame. The record was a compilation of old songs from previous albums rearranged with a more hard rock sounding, live tracks and an unreleased song, titled "Linea d'ombra". It was once more followed by a VHS featuring music videos, live performances samples and interviews. The year after, the band released its harder and most rock’n’roll album to date, Terremoto ("Earthquake"), soon followed by the double live CD Colpo di coda.

When changing their label from CGD to EMI (with legal complications due to the release of unauthorized compilations), the band hired a new bass player, Daniele "Barny" Bagni, and recorded the third volume of its "tetralogy of elements": El Diablo was celebrating fire, Terremoto soil, the new album Spirito (1994, whose name should have been Serpente d’asfalto) celebrates the air. The record was, as usual, followed by a VHS: Lacio drom which contains extracts from the "Spirito tour".

The 1997 Mondi Sommersi album, with its 500,000 copies sold in a few weeks, brought out the missing element, water, as Aiazzi left the band, replaced on keyboards by Terzani, who also remained the second guitar player (as it appears to be in the last tour). Litfiba's biggest tour was immortalized on a VHS, whose profits went to the victims of earthquakes in Umbria and Marche regions, and on a double live CD both titled Croce e delizia. Infinito (1999) was the very last chapter of the band's history with frontman Piero Pelù as a vocalist. Though much criticized because of its so-called "light" sound, the album sold 650,000 copies. On the "Infinito tour", tensions between Pelù and Renzulli became unbearable. The last show with Pelù took place at the "Monza Rock Festival 1999". He stopped being officially part of the band on July 11, 1999, subsequently starting a solo career.

Third era (1999-2009)
When Pelù said farewell to the band three of Litfiba's musicians also left with him: Bagni, Terzani and Caforio. Renzulli lost the rights to the band's logo, a horned heart, but kept the name Litfiba, which is copyrighted under his name. The guitarist then decided to follow on immediately with a renewed and rejuvenated band, including the new singer Gianluigi Cabo Cavallo, bass and drums player Gianluca Venier, and Ugo Nativi, coming from the funk-rock band Malfunk.

The 2000 album, first with new line-up, Elettromacumba reached 100,000 sales. On the following "Elettro tour", Litfiba, with Mauro Sabbione, who had already played on the El Diablo album, on keyboards, played in smaller halls than before. After the tour, the band released Live on Line, including 15 tracks recorded during the last tour available only for download under MP3 format through web portal Lycos.

The musicians went back to the studio, with Nativi replaced on drums by Gianmarco Colzi, who had played with band Rockgalileo and singer Biagio Antonacci, for the recording of the Insidia album (2001). The record was much different from the previous album, due to darker lyrics with many symbolic references and the significant use of electronics. It was soon followed by the "Insidia tour", a 73 concerts tour that was the first part of the "Never ending tour". The band was then requested to release the soundtrack for the Italian version of the Tomb raider 6 - The Angel of Darkness video game, resulting in the issue of "Larasong", a stand-alone single. Former keyboards player Antonio Aiazzi returned to the band for the 2003 "Lara Tour" and 2004 "04 Tour", the second and third part of the "Never ending tour". The last concert was recorded for the release of Litfiba's official first DVD.

The last album to date, Essere o sembrare (2005), appeared to be moderately inspired and had a relative success. The release of the record was followed by a short tour, almost 15 concerts, followed by others during 2006 summer. In late 2006 singer Gianluigi Gianluigi Cabo Cavallo leaves the band, followed by bass player Gianluca Venier and keyboard player Antonio Aiazzi. Filippo Margheri, who previously fronted Miir, replaced Cavallo, while Roberto Terzani, who had previously played with Litfiba, and Pino Fidanza join respectively at bass and drums.

Fourth era (2009-2022)
In November 2009, the long-time manager of the band Alberto Pirelli announced Litfiba was going to break up. One month later, on 11 December 2009, a message posted on the official website of the band announced the surprising reunion of the two historical founders: Piero Pelù and Ghigo Renzulli. They played four concerts in spring 2010 as Litfiba: Milan (13 April), Florence (16 April), Rome (19 April), and Acireale (21 April). A longer tour and a new album was expected in the second half of the year. The band published the successful live album "Stato Libero di Litfiba" which also included two unreleased tracks: "Sole Nero" and "Barcollo".
On January 17, 2012 the new album Grande nazione came out, led by the singles Squalo (25 November 2011) and La mia valigia (13 January 2012).
In January 2013 the band reunited with original founders Gianni Maroccolo and Antonio Aiazzi, as well as new addition on drums Luca Martelli (from Giorgio Canali's Rossofuoco) and started a tour called "Trilogia 1983-1989", playing only songs from the historical "Trilogy Of Power" plus some related singles from the same period. The band produced a live CD ("Trilogia '83-'89") at the end of the historical reunion. Later in 2013, Litfiba began a hiatus to permit its members to pursue their personal and artistic projects. After a last gig with the "Trilogia" line-up in Sardinia, the band announces a tour for 2015 which celebrated the following era of the band. The "Tetralogia Tour" focused on the 4 albums "El Diablo", "Terremoto", "Spirito" and "Mondi Sommersi", dedicated to the elements of fire, earth, air and water respectively. Ghigo and Piero hit the stage with a renewed line-up which included drummer Luca Martelli, keyboardist Federico Sagona (already on "Stato Libero" and "Grande Nazione") and new bass player Franco Li Causi. New album "Eutopia" follows, followed by some last tours in which keyboard player Fabrizio Simoncioni (already with the band as musician and engineer in the 90's) and bass player Dado Neri are involved.

As of 2022 Litfiba are no longer touring or recording.

Discography

Studio albums
 Desaparecido (1985)
 17 Re (1986)
 Litfiba 3 (1988)
 El Diablo (1990)
 Terremoto (1993)
 Spirito (1994)
 Mondi Sommersi (1997)
 Infinito (1999)
 Elettromacumba (2000)
 Insidia (2001)
 Essere o sembrare (2005)
 Grande Nazione (2012)
 Eutòpia (2016)

Other releases
 Guerra (1982, EP)
 Luna/La preda (1983, single)
 Eneide di Krypton (1983, soundtrack album)
 Yassassin (1984, EP)
 Transea (1986, EP)
 Live 12-5-87 (Aprite i vostri occhi) (1987, live album)
 Pirata (1989, live album)
 Sogno Ribelle (1992, greatest hits + 1 unreleased song)
 Colpo di coda (1994, live album + 2 unreleased songs)
 Lacio Drom (1994, a box containing a VHS and a live album + 4 remixed songs)
 Croce e delizia (1998, live album)
 Live on Line (2000, live album)
 The Platinum Collection (2003, greatest hits)
 Stato libero di Litfiba (2010, live album + 2 unreleased songs)
 Trilogia 1983-1989 live 2013 (2013, live album)

Line-up

Last line-up
 Federico "Ghigo" Renzulli: guitars (founder member; 1980–2022)
 Piero Pelù: vocals (1980–1999, 2009–2022)
 Fabrizio Simoncioni: keyboards (1990, 2016–2022)
 Luca Martelli: drums (2012–2022)
 Dado Neri: bass (2021–2022)

Past members
 Gianni Maroccolo: bass (founder member; 1980–1989, 2012-2014)
 Antonio Aiazzi: keyboards (1980–1997, 2003–2006, 2012–2014, 2016)
 Federico Sagona: Keyboards (2009-2012, 2015-2016)
 Sandro Dotta: guitars (founder member; 1980)
 Francesco Calamai: drums (founder member; 1980–1983)
 Francesco Magnelli: keyboards (1983-1989)
 Renzo Franchi: drums (1983)
 Adriano Primadei: violin (1984)
 Ringo De Palma: drums (1983–1989)
 Daniele Trambusti: drums (1987, 1989–1992)
 Roberto Terzani: bass (1989-1994, 2007-2009), rhythm guitar (1994-1999) and keyboards (1997-1999)
 Candelo Cabezas: percussions (1989–1992, 1994–1997)
 Mauro Sabbione: keyboards (1990, 2000–2001)
 Federico Poggipollini: rhythm guitar (1990–1993)
 Franco Caforio: drums (1992-1999)
 Daniele Bagni: bass (1994–1999, 2009–2012)
 Gianluigi Cavallo: vocals (1999–2006)
 Gianluca Venier: bass (1999–2006), keyboards (2016)
 Ugo Nativi: drums (1999–2001)
 Gianmarco Colzi: drums (2001–2008)
 Filippo Margheri: vocals (2007–2009)
 Pino Fidanza: drums (2008–2012)
 Cosimo Zannelli: rhythm guitar (2011-2012)
 Franco Li Causi: bass (2015–2017)

External links
Official band website
Official fan-club website
wiki.litfiba (the official biography written by the fans)

Italian musical groups
Musical groups established in 1980
Italian new wave musical groups
Musical groups from Florence